This is a list of candidates of the 1938 South Australian state election. The House of Assembly changed from having multi-member to single-member electorates at this election, which combined with the partisan turmoil of the two previous terms saw a number of formerly partisan figures run as independents at this election.

Retiring MPs

Labor

 John Pedler (Wallaroo) – lost preselection
 William Threadgold (Port Pirie) – lost preselection

Liberal and Country League

 Ronald Hunt (Victoria) – lost preselection
 Herbert Lyons (Barossa) – retired
 Victor Marra Newland (North Adelaide) – retired
 Baden Pattinson (Yorke Peninsula) – retired
 Frank Perry (East Torrens) – lost preselection
 Henry Tassie MLC (Central No. 2 District) – lost preselection

Legislative Assembly

Sitting members are shown in bold text. Successful candidates are marked with an asterisk.

Legislative Council

References

1938 elections in Australia
Candidates for South Australian state elections
1930s in South Australia